The Battle of Apros occurred between the forces of the Byzantine Empire, under co-emperor Michael IX Palaiologos, and the forces of the Catalan Company, at Apros on July 1305.

The Catalan Company had been hired by the Byzantines as mercenaries against the Turks, but despite the Catalans' successes against the Turks, the two allies distrusted each other, and their relationship was strained by the Catalans' financial demands. Eventually, Emperor Andronikos II Palaiologos and his son and co-ruler Michael IX had the Catalan leader, Roger de Flor, assassinated with his entourage in April 1305. 

In July, the Byzantine army, comprising a large contingent of Alans as well as many Turcopoles, confronted the Catalans and their own Turkish allies near Apros in Thrace. Despite the Imperial Army's numerical superiority, the Alans withdrew after the first charge, whereupon the Turcopoles deserted en block to the Catalans. Prince Michael was injured and left the field and the Catalans won the day.

The Catalans proceeded to ravage Thrace for two years, before moving west and south through Thessaly, to conquer the Latin Duchy of Athens in 1311.

References

Bibliography

Apros
Apros
Apros
Catalan Company
History of Tekirdağ Province
1300s in the Byzantine Empire
1305 in Europe